The Journal of Architecture is a peer-reviewed academic journal published eight times a year by Routledge on behalf of the Royal Institute of British Architects. It was established in 1996.

References

External links

Architecture journals
Routledge academic journals
Publications established in 1996
English-language journals
1947 establishments in the United Kingdom